The House of Connelly is a 1931 Broadway two-act drama written by 
Paul Green, produced by the Group Theatre in association with The Theatre Guild and staged by Lee Strasberg and Cheryl Crawford. It ran for 91 performances from September 28, 1931 to November 14, 1931 at the Martin Beck Theatre and then from November 16, 1931 to 
January 2, 1932 at the Mansfield Theatre. It was the inaugural production of the Group Theatre.

It was adapted into the 1934 film Carolina directed by Henry King and starring Janet Gaynor, 
Lionel Barrymore and Robert Young.

Cast

 Stella Adler as Geraldine Connelly
 Eunice Stoddard as Evelyn Connelly
 Morris Carnovsky as Robert Connelly
 Franchot Tone as Will Connelly	
 Phoebe Brand as Serenader	
 J. Edward Bromberg as Duffy	
 William Challee as Jodie and as Serenader	
 Walter Coy as Charlie and as Serenader
 Lewis Leverett as	Serenader	
 Robert Lewis as Alf and as Serenader
 Rose McClendon as Big Sue	
 Mary Morris as Mrs. Connelly	
 Ruth Nelson as Essie	
 Clifford Odets as Reuben and as Serenader	
 Art Smith as Jesse Tate	
 Margaret Barker as Patsy Tate		
 Fanny De Knight as Big Sis	
 Virginia Farmer as Serenader	
 Sylvia Feningston as Serenader	
 Friendly Ford as Isaac and as	Serenader	
 Gerrit Kraber as Tyler and as Serenader	
 Gertrude Maynard as Serenader	
 Paula Miller as Serenader	
 Dorothy Patten as Virginia Buchanan	
 Herbert Ratner as Henry	
 Philip Robinson as Ransom and as Serenader	
 Clement Wilenchick as	Alec and as Serenader

References

External links 
  
  (archive)
 
 

1931 plays
Broadway plays
Plays set in the United States
Plays by Paul Green
American plays adapted into films